This is a list of casinos in Puerto Rico.

List of casinos

You must be 18 to enter a casino in Puerto Rico (18 is the legal gambling age), ID is needed for locals, and tourists need to show a passport to enter.

See also

 List of companies of Puerto Rico
 List of hotels in Puerto Rico
List of casinos in the United States 
Tourism in Puerto Rico

References

External links

Casinos
Puerto Rico
Casinos
Casinos in Puerto Rico